Kiril Dzhorov (born 12 August 1975) is a retired Bulgarian footballer who played as a defender.

References

External links

1975 births
Living people
Bulgarian footballers
First Professional Football League (Bulgaria) players
OFC Vihren Sandanski players
F.C. Metalurg Pernik players
PFC Minyor Pernik players
PFC Slavia Sofia players
PFC Rodopa Smolyan players
PFC Cherno More Varna players
PFC Lokomotiv Mezdra players
Association football defenders
Bulgarian expatriate footballers
Expatriate footballers in Malta
People from Sandanski
Sportspeople from Blagoevgrad Province